The Billboard Hot 100 is a U.S. weekly music chart.

Hot 100 may also refer to:

Record charts
 The Argentina Hot 100
 Billboard Brasil Hot 100
 The Canadian Hot 100
 Eurochart Hot 100 Singles
 The Japan Hot 100
 The Korea K-Pop Hot 100
 The Vietnam Hot 100

Radio

Radio stations
 Hot 100, WWOT, Pennsylvania
 Hot 100 FM, Darwin, Australia

Radio programs
 Hot 100 (Japan FM League)

Other uses
 Phillips' Hot 100, a hundred-proof (50% ABV), cinnamon-flavored schnapps produced by the Phillips Distilling Company
 Maxim Hot 100, Maxim magazine's annual list that features the 100 hottest women of the year

See also
 The Triple J Hottest 100, an annual music listener poll